Bandar Sungai Long is a main township in Cheras, Selangor, Malaysia. Bandar Sungai Long was designed for a population of 10,000 residents. The majority population in this township are Chinese with a minority of Indians and Malays living in this township. 

The Universiti Tunku Abdul Rahman (UTAR) operates a campus in Sungai Long. It is currently under the administration of local council Majlis Perbandaran Kajang (MPKj).

The Sungai Long Golf & Country Club is situated in this township. It was built around the "leisure" living theme with residential homes surrounding an 18-hole golf course. High end detached houses were built around the golf course with semi-detached and terraced residential dwellings alongside condominiums, commercial properties and low cost low rise apartments on the outer edges of the development. 

Sungai Long Buddhist Society was established in 2006 to create a close-knit Buddhist community in Bandar Sungai Long. A weekly pasar malam (night market) is held here every Tuesday. The 10th and current Prime Minister of Malaysia, Dato' Seri Anwar Ibrahim, currently resides in Bandar Sungai Long with his family since 2021.

Educational

Secondary
Sekolah Menengah Kebangsaan Bandar Baru Sungai Long

Primary
 Sekolah Jenis Kebangsaan (Cina) Bandar Baru Sungai Long
 Sekolah Kebangsaan Taman Rakan

Tertiary
 Universiti Tunku Abdul Rahman (UTAR) Sungai Long Campus

References

External links
BandarSungaiLong.com43000 Selangor Darul Ehsan

Hulu Langat District
Townships in Selangor